Dead or Alive were an English pop band that released seven studio albums from 1984 to 2000. The band formed in 1980 in Liverpool and found success in the mid-1980s, releasing seven singles that made the UK top 40 and three albums on the UK top 30. At the peak of their success, the lineup consisted of Pete Burns (vocals), Steve Coy (drums), Mike Percy (bass) and Tim Lever (keyboards), with the core pair of Burns and Coy writing and producing for the remainder of the band's career.

Two of the band's singles reached the U.S. top 20 on the Billboard Hot 100: "You Spin Me Round (Like a Record)" (No. 11 in August 1985) and "Brand New Lover" (No. 15 in March 1987).

"You Spin Me Round (Like a Record)" peaked at number one for two weeks in 1985 in the UK, then charted again in 2006 following Burns' appearance on the television reality show Celebrity Big Brother and on season 4 of Stranger Things. It also became the first of two singles to top the Billboard Hot Dance Club Play chart. In December 2016, Billboard ranked them as the 96th most successful "dance artist" of all time. The band was discontinued following Pete Burns' death in 2016.

History

Formation and early career of band

In 1977, Burns formed a band with contemporaries Julian Cope, Pete Wylie, and Phil Hurst, calling themselves The Mystery Girls. They played only one gig (opening for Sham 69 at Eric's in Liverpool in November 1977) before disintegrating. Burns returned in early 1979 with a new band, Nightmares in Wax (original name: 'Rainbows Over Nagasaki'), featuring a gothic post-punk sound, with backing from keyboardist Martin Healy, guitarist Mick Reid (ex-Crash Course and Glass Torpedoes), bassist Rob Jones, who left soon afterwards to be replaced by Walter Ogden, and drummer Paul Hornby, formerly of 051 and Pink Military, who also exited soon after the band's formation to be replaced by Phil Hurst. Nightmares in Wax played their first gig supporting Wire at Eric's in July 1979, and, around the same time, recorded demos which included a cover of the Simon Dupree and the Big Sound song "Kites", a feature of their early shows. Although signed to the Eric's Records label, their only release, a three-track 7-inch EP entitled Birth of a Nation, appeared in March 1980 on Inevitable Records. A 12-inch single featuring two of the tracks from the EP, "Black Leather" and "Shangri-La", was released in 1985. The EP featured "Black Leather", which halfway through turned into K.C. & the Sunshine Band's "That's the Way (I Like It)" (a song later revived by Dead or Alive).

Ogden left the band at the beginning of November 1979 shortly before the recording of demos for the planned Inevitable Records release. Bassist Ambrose Reynolds helped out on both these sessions and those for the EP a month later. Pete Lloyd joined in January 1980 and the band returned to playing live shows early in February. Lloyd and Reid left the band in March 1980, and Hurst followed in April. Burns and Healy were then joined by bassist Sue James, guitarist Adrian Mitchley, and drummer Joe Musker rehearsing for a few months under the name No Self Control, this being dropped in favour of Dead Or Alive shortly before the release of the next single "I'm Falling". The band went through several line-up changes over the next three years while recording a series of independent singles. Burns' eccentric and androgynous appearance began attracting attention, often leading to comparisons with Culture Club and its lead singer Boy George.

Dead or Alive's singles started charting on the UK Indie Chart, beginning with 1982's "The Stranger" reaching No. 7 on that chart. This prompted major label Epic Records to sign the band in 1983. Their first release for Epic was the single "Misty Circles", which appeared at No. 100 on the major UK Singles Chart in 1983. At this point, the band was a five-piece consisting of Burns, Mike Percy (bass), Tim Lever (keyboards/sax), Steve Coy (drums), and Wayne Hussey (guitar). Two more singles, "What I Want" and "I'd Do Anything", attracted club play, but mainstream success continued to elude the band.

Dead or Alive's debut album, Sophisticated Boom Boom, was released in May 1984 and featured their first Top 40 UK single, "That's the Way (I Like It)", a remake of the 1975 hit by KC and the Sunshine Band. Hussey departed Dead or Alive just before the album's release. The single peaked at No. 22 in the UK and the album at No. 29.

1980s chart success
Following the departure of Hussey, the band released its second album Youthquake (US No. 31, UK No. 9) in May 1985, produced by the then-fledgling production team of Mike Stock, Matt Aitken, and Pete Waterman known as Stock Aitken Waterman (SAW). Recording of the first single "You Spin Me Round (Like a Record)" was plagued by arguments between the band and producers, but became the band's first song to reach number 1 on the UK Singles Chart after lingering outside the Top 40 for over two months. The song also proved to be SAW's first chart-topping single. The track also hit No. 11 in the US and No. 1 in Canada. Other album tracks released as singles included "Lover Come Back To Me", "In Too Deep", and "My Heart Goes Bang". They all reached the UK Top 30.

In late 1986, Dead or Alive released their third album, Mad, Bad and Dangerous to Know (US No. 52, UK No. 27), also produced by SAW. Production of the album was marred by more fights between the band and SAW, with the latter frustrated by the band's refusal to branch into House music, and singer Pete Burns unwilling to hand over songwriting duties to the producers. 

Burns expressed frustration with his record company's reluctant attitude towards his single choices, complaining the label only relented on scheduling "Brand New Lover" for release after Bananarama had a hit with their Dead or Alive-inspired cover of "Venus", and alleging they also refused to give "Something In My House" a Halloween release date. A fight over mixes for the album's third single, "Hooked On Love" escalated to such a degree that Burns refused to film a video, accusing the label of "fucking up" the release.

While Burns claimed vicious studio arguments during production of the album made him ill, SAW's recording engineer Karen Hewitt recalled the singer appeared to thrive on his often explosive and confrontational dynamic with Mike Stock and Matt Aitken during the album sessions. Matt Aitken confessed to struggling with Burns' vocal experimentation on the second SAW-produced album, including what he described as the introduction of a displeasing yodel.

The lead single "Brand New Lover" became a modest UK hit, peaking at No. 31, but was more successful in the US where it reached No. 15 on the US Hot 100, and number one on the US Billboard dance chart. Burns blamed the relative underperformance of the single in the UK on the record company's failure to press and distribute enough copies of the single to meet customer demand.

Three more singles from the album were released, although none saw any notable US success on the pop charts. All of these singles caused some sort of controversy in the UK.

The most successful in the UK was "Something in My House" (UK No. 12), tonally Gothic and with a sleeve depicting Burns in front of what appears to be a Satanic altar, featuring an inverted cross. A 12-inch version of the song, the 'Mortevicar Mix', featured scenes from Nosferatu and sampling of dialogue from the soundtrack of The Exorcist and a sampling from the George A. Romero American movie trailer from his film Day of the Dead (1985) and other '80s horror films. A highly controversial 12-inch white label mix, known as "Naughty XXX", was also released to club DJs, featuring a series of stronger dialogue clips from The Exorcist - with the track described as "unique" in its capacity as the only known example of a "filthy, obscene [and] sexually explicit" Stock Aitken Waterman record.

A third single, "Hooked on Love", failed to make the UK Top 40 amid Burns' battle with the label over their refusal to prioritise his preferred mix, which featured "Gothic" overtone.

After the release of the album, Tim Lever and Mike Percy left the band to form careers as mixers and producers aka 'One World Productions'. The pair owned and operated Steelworks Studios in Sheffield, UK. As mixers and producers, Lever and Percy experienced success writing and mixing songs for acts like S Club 7, Blue, and Robbie Williams. Lever and Percy have since left the studio, with the former being now a guitar luthier. In 1987, Dead or Alive released their greatest hits album Rip It Up, and a concert tour of the same name. In mid 1988, Dead or Alive, now pared down to a duo of Burns and Coy, released the self-produced Nude, which featured the single "Turn Around and Count 2 Ten". It was followed by "Come Home with Me Baby". The single was a US club hit, including number one on the US dance charts.

1980s and early 1990s success in Japan
In the late 1980s and early 1990s, at the height of the bubble economy, the disco boom was a huge success in Japan. Burns made numerous appearances on national television, including "Yoru no Hit Studio", and his music was regularly selected by the Maharaja, the largest and most exclusive disco chain at the time. A few cover songs by Japanese singers have been released. 

As a result, Dead or Alive had a great influence on Japanese idol songs and their successors, J-Pop and Visual Kei. Even after the mid-1990s, when the band had passed the peak of their popularity elsewhere, their popularity in Japan was so high that some of their later albums were released only in Japan, and they visited Japan frequently.

1990s
1990 saw the band produce their next studio album, Fan the Flame (Part 1), although their only successful record deal was in Japan. The album remained exclusive in this territory for many years. It had three singles, "Your Sweetness (Is Your Weakness)", "Gone Too Long", and "Unhappy Birthday". 

The band had begun to produce Fan the Flame (Part 2), however the album was shelved until a project to finish it in 2021. Some tracks were later re-recorded for the band's Nukleopatra album. It is often confused with an acoustic, commercially unreleased album named Love, Pete, which was sold in cassette form on the band's 1992 tour - during which songs from Part 2 were debuted.

For a few years, Dead or Alive were mostly inactive in the recording studio. Burns resurfaced in 1994 as vocalist on a single for the Italian techno outfit Glam. Burns helped write the single, "Sex Drive", which was a return to the dance floor. 

Burns and Coy left their international deal with CBS, and signed with Pete Waterman's PWL Records. Recording was started on new tracks cowritten and produced by Mike Stock, but the sessions were aborted when Stock abruptly quit PWL over his dissatisfaction with his share of publishing royalties on the new Dead Or Alive material. Work on new material recommenced with PWL staffer Barry Stone taking over co-production duties. 

The band flirted with the idea of recording under the name International Chrysis, named after the late transsexual nightclub performer, and released a single as such in 1994, a cover version of David Bowie's "Rebel Rebel". An initial demo of the track, which featured some new lyrics written by Burns, was blocked by Bowie - who denied permission to use Burns' new lyrics, and also requested the track not be covered by the band at all.

The year 1995 saw new work from Dead or Alive with new keyboardists Jason Alburey and Dean Bright, joining Burns and Coy for the album Nukleopatra. The album featured a smattering of previously released material, including "Rebel Rebel", "Sex Drive", and two tracks that originally appeared on Fan the Flame (Part 1), "Gone Too Long" and "Unhappy Birthday". The album also featured a cover of Blondie's "Picture This". Initially released in Japan only, Nukleopatra was later released in Australia, Singapore, South Africa, France and the United States, and each release sported different cover art, track listings, and song versions. Many releases of Nukleopatra also included one or more remixes of "You Spin Me Round (Like a Record)".

2000s
In 2000, Dead or Alive released Fragile, a collection of remakes with several new tracks and covers including U2's "Even Better Than the Real Thing" and Nick Kamen's "I Promised Myself". This would eventually be their Seventh and final studio album. A new remix album, Unbreakable, was released in 2001. This was followed by a greatest hits album entitled Evolution: the Hits, released in 2003 which featured yet another remix of "You Spin Me Round (Like a Record)"; both of them enjoyed, for the first time since Nude, a UK release, with "You Spin Me Round (Like a Record)" re-entering the Top 40. Later on in 2003, Alburey and Bright departed the band, leaving Dead or Alive once again a duo of Burns and Coy.

In 2004, Burns enjoyed solo success with the Pet Shop Boys-produced track "Jack and Jill Party". Although only released through the Pet Shop Boys website, the track reached number 75 in the UK singles chart.

2010s
In September 2010, Burns released a new single, "Never Marry an Icon". Even though Burns stated Dead or Alive had ceased to exist in 2011, Coy later declared the moniker was still active and the band was not over.

On 21 December 2012, Burns and Coy (as Dead or Alive) performed at the Pete Waterman concert, Hit Factory Live at London's O2 Arena. Other artists on the bill included Jason Donovan, Rick Astley, Steps, Sinitta, Pepsi & Shirlie, Hazell Dean, Princess, Sybil, 2 Unlimited, Lonnie Gordon and Brother Beyond.

Burns died of cardiac arrest on 23 October 2016, at the age of 57, effectively ending the band.

On 28 October 2016, a 19-disc box set titled Sophisticated Boom Box MMXVI was released by Edsel Records. The box set featured all records, singles and rarities produced by Dead or Alive from 1983 to 2010, including Pete Burns' solo releases. Coy hinted there may be a second box set in the future to come and previously unreleased Dead or Alive albums as well.

Steve Coy died on 4 May 2018 at the age of 56.

Concerts
The band toured regularly in the UK in the first half of the 1980s. Their first world tour began in 1987, with dates in Europe, the US, and Japan. Film footage was recorded at two shows at Tokyo's Nippon Budokan on 9 October and at Osaka's Osaka-jō Hall on 11 October 1987, and released on video cassette (VHS) and Laserdisc that same year under the title Rip It Up Live.

The concert was eventually issued as bonus material for the first time on DVD as part of the 2003 compilation release.

A studio version of Rip It Up consisting of the original studio and remix versions of Dead or Alive's best known songs was released on vinyl, cassette and compact disc that same year.

In 1994, Dead or Alive started performing in local night-clubs. Dead or Alive were featured at Gay Pride in Los Angeles in 1995.

Celebrity Big Brother
In 2006, Pete Burns took part in the TV show Celebrity Big Brother in the UK. Burns became known for openly insulting actress Traci Bingham and performing modern dance with Respect MP George Galloway. Following the end of the show (Burns finished in fifth place), "You Spin Me Round (Like a Record)" (from 1985's Youthquake album) was re-released.

Personnel – Nightmares in Wax/Dead or Alive
Members

 Pete Burns – vocals, tambourine (in some music videos he portrayed the guitar-playing, but actually never played any kind of instruments) (1979–2016; his death)
 Martin Healy – keyboards (1979–1983)
 Mick Reid – guitars (1979–1980)
 Walter Ogden – bass (1979)
 Rob Jones – bass (1979)
 Paul Hornby – drums (1979)
 Phil Hurst – drums (1979–1980)
 Pete Lloyd – bass (1980)
 Joe Musker – drums (1980–1982)

 Sue James – bass (1980–1981)
 Adrian Mitchley – guitars (1980–1981)
 Mike Percy – bass, guitars, keyboards (1981–1988)
 Wayne Hussey – guitars (1981–1984)
 Steve Coy – drums, percussion, keyboards, guitars, bass (1982–2016; died 2018)
 Timothy "Tim" Lever – keyboards, saxophone, guitars, sequencers (1983–1988)
 Peter Oxendale – keyboards (1989–1995)
 Jason Alburey – keyboards, guitars (1995–2003)
 Dean Bright – keyboards, keytar (1995–2003)

Touring members
 Sonia Mazumder  – dancer, backing vocals (1982–1984)
 James Hyde – dancer (1987–1990)
 Adam Perry – dancer (1987)
 Simon Gogerly - keytar, keyboards (1989)
 B.J. Smouth - keyboards (1989)
 Gary Hughes - dancer (1989)
 Matt Selby - dancer (1989)
 Tony Griffiths - dancer (1989)
 Steve Agyei - dancer (1989)
 Zeb Jamenson - keyboards (1990)
 Tracy Ackerman - backing vocals (1990)
 Tony Griffith - dancer (1990)
 Philip Hurst - dancer (1990)
 Mark Scott - dancer (1990)
 Cliff Slapher - keyboards (2001)
 Micki Dee - keyboards (2001)

Timeline

Discography

Studio albums
 Sophisticated Boom Boom (1984)
 Youthquake (1985)
 Mad, Bad and Dangerous to Know (1986)
 Nude (1988)
 Fan the Flame (Part 1) (1990)
 Nukleopatra (1995)
 Fragile (2000)
  Fan The Flame (Part:2): The Resurrection (2021)

See also
 List of number-one dance hits (United States)
 List of artists who reached number one on the US Dance chart

References

Musical groups established in 1980
Musical groups disestablished in 2016
British hi-NRG groups
English new wave musical groups
English synth-pop groups
British synth-pop new wave groups
Musical groups from Liverpool
Scouse culture of the early 1980s
Cleopatra Records artists
Epic Records artists
Sony Music Entertainment Japan artists
Avex Trax artists
Dance-pop groups
1980 establishments in England